Ajeromi-Ifelodun is a Local Government Area in Badagry Division, Lagos State.  It has some 57,276.3 inhabitants per square kilometer, among if not the world's densest.

References

External links
 Ajeromi-Ifelodun LGA site
 Lagos State

Local Government Areas in Lagos State
Local Government Areas in Yorubaland